Federal Party may refer to:

Federal Party (1973)  –  a provincial political party in modern Argentina
Federalist Party (Argentina)  – a 19th-century political party in Argentina
Federal Party (Puerto Rico)
Federal Party (Rhodesia and Nyasaland)
Federal Party (Sri Lanka)
Federalist Party, United States
Federalist Party (Austria)
Federalist Party (France)
Federalist Party (Italy)
Federalist Party (Philippines)

See also
Partido Federal (disambiguation)
Taxpayers Party of New York, later party that used the Federalist Party name for one candidate in 2011
 Federal Union (disambiguation)